The Itombwe flycatcher (Muscicapa itombwensis) is a bird species in the Old World flycatcher family (Muscicapidae). It is found in the eastern Democratic Republic of the Congo. It was formerly considered a subspecies of Chapin's flycatcher.

Its natural habitat is subtropical or tropical moist montane forests. It is threatened by habitat loss.

References

Itombwe flycatcher
Birds of Sub-Saharan Africa
Itombwe flycatcher